Wondai  is a rural town and locality in the South Burnett Region, Queensland, Australia.

Geography

History 

The name Wondai is believed to be an aboriginal word from the Wakawaka language derived from either  meaning dingo (a native dog) or  meaning nape of the neck.

Wondai was first settled in the 1850s and closer settlement took place in the early 1900s.

Wondai Provisional School opened on 2 May 1905. On 1 January 1909 it became Wondai State School. A secondary department was added in 1964.

Wondai Methodist Church opened on Sunday 4 October 1908, being replaced by the current church building on 9 August 1914. When the Methodist Church amalgamated into the Uniting Church in Australia in 1977, it became Wondai Uniting Church.

In December 1912, a Baptist church opened in Wondai.

St Mary's Anglican Church was dedicated on Thursday 21 September 1939 by Archbishop William Wand. It replaced an earlier church.

St John-Trinity Lutheran Church was built from timber in 1950. In 1964, St John's Lutheran Church in Mondure was relocated to Wondai to become the church hall for St John-Triniity Lutheran church.

On Sunday 31 January 1954, Archbishop James Duhig opened the St John the Baptist Primary Catholic School in Wondai. It was operated the Presentation Sisters who already operated a convent school in Murgon. The school was always small with only two or three teachers serving there. In January 1968 it was decided that the two teachers should travel by car from the Murgon convent each day rather than operate a separate convent in Wondai.

Heritage listings 
Wondai has a number of heritage-listed sites, including:
 Mundubbera-Durong Road, Boondooma: Boondooma Homestead

Economy 
Important industries include beef, dairy, grains and duboisia, used in the production of the antispasmodic drug butylscopolamine.  Growing in importance is the wine industry.

Education 
Wondai State School is a government primary and secondary (Prep-9) school for boys and girls at 32 Kent Street. In 2018, the school had an enrolment of 162 students with 20 teachers (18 full-time equivalent) and 17 non-teaching staff (13 full-time equivalent). It includes a special education program.

For secondary education to Year 12, the nearest schools are Murgon State High School in Murgon to the north-west or Kingaroy State High School in Kingaroy to the south.

Amenities 
The South Burnett Regional Council operates a library in Wondai. The Wondai library building opened in 1962 and is located at 78 Mackenzie Street.

The Wondai branch of the Queensland Country Women's Association meets at 86 McKenzie Street.

St Mary's Anglican Church is at 32 Baynes Street.

St John the Baptist Catholic Church is at 16 Bramston Street.

Wondai Uniting Church (formerly Wondai Methodist Church) is at 56 Pring Street.

Wondai Baptist Church is at 48 Cadell Street.

St Andrew's Presbyterian Church is at 38 Pring Street.

St John-Trinity Lutheran Church is at 37 Edward Street.

Notable residents 
Notable people from Wondai include
 Australian Test cricketers Carl Rackemann and Nathan Hauritz.
 Country music artist/comedian Chad Morgan
Wondai was also home to the legendary pacer Wondai's Mate.

References

Further reading

External links 

 
 
 SMH Travel article

Towns in Queensland
Localities in Queensland
South Burnett Region